Ami Ghia Shah (born 8 December 1956) is a former badminton player from Gujarat, India. She is a seven-time National singles champion, twelve-time doubles winner and a four-time mixed doubles winner. She received the Arjuna Award in 1976.

References

External links
 

Indian female badminton players
Indian national badminton champions
Badminton players at the 1978 Commonwealth Games
Badminton players at the 1982 Commonwealth Games
Commonwealth Games bronze medallists for India
Commonwealth Games medallists in badminton
People from Surat
Recipients of the Arjuna Award
1956 births
Living people
Sportswomen from Gujarat
Asian Games medalists in badminton
Badminton players at the 1978 Asian Games
Badminton players at the 1982 Asian Games
Badminton players at the 1986 Asian Games
Sportspeople from Surat
20th-century Indian women
20th-century Indian people
Racket sportspeople from Gujarat
Asian Games bronze medalists for India
Medalists at the 1982 Asian Games
Medallists at the 1978 Commonwealth Games